Diane Swanton (born August 11, 1979 in Pretoria) is a South African sport shooter. She won the gold medal for trap shooting at the 2006 Commonwealth Games in Melbourne, Australia, with a games record of 72 points. Swanton also received a qualifying place for the Olympics by capturing the gold in the same category at the 2007 ISSF African Shooting Championships in Cairo, Egypt, defeating Namibia's Gaby Ahrens.

At age twenty-nine, Swanton made her official debut for the 2008 Summer Olympics in Beijing, where she competed in women's trap shooting. She placed seventeenth out of twenty shooters in the qualifying rounds, behind Great Britain's Charlotte Kerwood by one target, with a total score of 57 points.

Swanton is also a member of Centurion Gun Club in Centurion, and is coached and trained by her father Tim Swanton.

References

External links
ISSF Profile
NBC Olympics Profile

South African female sport shooters
Living people
Olympic shooters of South Africa
Shooters at the 2006 Commonwealth Games
Shooters at the 2008 Summer Olympics
Sportspeople from Pretoria
1979 births
Commonwealth Games gold medallists for South Africa
Commonwealth Games medallists in shooting
21st-century South African women
Medallists at the 2006 Commonwealth Games